Dawid Glowacki (born ) is a Polish male  track cyclist, riding for the national team. He competed in the team pursuit and madison event at the 2010 UCI Track Cycling World Championships.

References

External links
 Profile at cyclingarchives.com

1987 births
Living people
Polish track cyclists
Polish male cyclists
Place of birth missing (living people)
21st-century Polish people